Makhdoomzada Syed Basit Sultan Bukhari (born 28 May 1969) is a Pakistani politician who has been a member of the National Assembly of Pakistan since August 2018. Previously he was a member of the National Assembly from 2002 to 2007 and again from June 2013 to April 2018.

Early life
He was born on 28 May 1969.

Political career

He was elected to the National Assembly of Pakistan as a candidate of Pakistan Muslim League (Q) (PML-Q) from Constituency NA-179 (Muzaffargarh-IV) in 2002 Pakistani general election. He received 63,778 votes and defeated Abdul Qayyum Khan Jatoi.

He ran for the seat of the National Assembly as a candidate of PML-Q from Constituency NA-179 (Muzaffargarh-IV) in 2008 Pakistani general election, but was unsuccessful. He received 60,637 votes and lost the seat to Muhammad Moazam Ali Khan Jatoi. In the same election, he ran for the seat of the Provincial Assembly of the Punjab as an independent candidate from Constituency PP-258 (Muzaffargarh-VIII) but was unsuccessful. He received 1,163 votes and lost the seat to Abdul Qayyum Khan Jatoi.

He was re-elected to the National Assembly as a candidate of Pakistan Muslim League (N) (PML-N) from Constituency NA-179 (Muzaffargarh) in 2013 Pakistani general election. He received 110,197 votes and defeated Muhammad Moazam Ali Khan Jatoi.

In April 2018, he quit PML-N and resigned from the National Assembly. He joined Pakistan Tehreek-e-Insaf (PTI) in May 2018.

He was re-elected to the National Assembly as an independent candidate from Constituency NA-185 (Muzaffargarh-V) in 2018 Pakistani general election. Following his successful election, he announced to re-join PTI.

External Link

More Reading
 List of members of the 15th National Assembly of Pakistan

References

Living people
Pakistan Muslim League (N) politicians
Punjabi people
Pakistani MNAs 2013–2018
1969 births
Pakistani MNAs 2002–2007
Pakistani MNAs 2018–2023
People from Muzaffargarh
Politicians from Muzaffargarh